MAH may refer to:

Mah, the Avestan language word for both the moon and for the Zoroastrian divinity
Malév Hungarian Airlines (ICAO code), the flag carrier airline of Hungary
Mansion House tube station, London, London Underground station code
Menorca Airport (IATA airport code), the airport serving the Balearic island of Minorca in the Mediterranean Sea
Milli Emniyet Hizmeti, former Turkish government intelligence agency
milliampere-hour, often abbreviated as mAh or mA·h, a unit of electric charge
Monocyclic aromatic hydrocarbon, a type of chemical compound
My American Heart, an American band
M.A.H., an honorary master's degree granted ad eundem
Santa Cruz Museum of Art and History, Santa Cruz, California

See also 
Mah (disambiguation)